Landmark is the debut studio album by American rock band Hippo Campus. It was released on February 24, 2017, through Grand Jury Music and Transgressive Records.

Track listing

Personnel

Hippo Campus
Jake Luppen – lead vocals, guitar
Nathan Stocker – guitar, backing vocals
Zach Sutton – bass, backing vocals
Whistler Allen – drums, backing vocals

Additional musicians
DeCarlo Jackson – brass

Production
 Producer and Mixing – BJ Burton

Charts

References

External links

2017 debut albums
Hippo Campus albums
Transgressive Records albums
Albums produced by BJ Burton
Albums recorded at Sonic Ranch